Baharon Ke Manzil is a 1991 Indian Hindi-language film directed by Madhava Rao and produced by P.Subba Rao for P.S.R.Pictures, Madras, starring Mona Ambegaonkar, Roopesh Kothari, Jeet Upendra and Paresh Rawal.

Plot 

Baharon Ke Manzil is a musical film, the story of an unusual friendship between a girl and 4 upcoming musicians.

Cast 

Mona Ambegaonkar as Asha
Roopesh Kothari
Jeet Upendra
Rakesh Bedi
Reema Lagoo
Sunil Lahri
Alok Nath
Paresh Rawal
Satish Shah
Ajit Vachani

Soundtrack 

The music was composed by Raamlaxman.

References

External links 
 

1991 films
1990s Hindi-language films
Indian musical films
1990s musical films
Films scored by Raamlaxman
Hindi remakes of Tamil films